Abasingammedda is a village in the Kandy District, Central Province, Sri Lanka. It has a population of about 11,000.

Populated places in Kandy District